The 62nd United States Congress was a meeting of the legislative branch of the United States federal government, composed of the United States Senate and the United States House of Representatives. It met in Washington, D.C., from March 4, 1911, to March 4, 1913, during the final two years of William H. Taft's presidency.

The apportionment of seats in the House of Representatives was based on the 1900 United States census. Additional House seats were assigned to the two new states of New Mexico and Arizona. The size of the House was to be 435 starting with the new Congress coming into session in 1913. The Senate had a Republican majority, and the House had a Democratic majority.

Major events 

 April 27, 1911: Following the resignation and death of William P. Frye, a compromise is reached to rotate the office of President pro tempore of the United States Senate.
 October 30, 1912: Vice President James S. Sherman died.

Major legislation 

 August 8, 1911: Public Law 62-5,  (set House of Representatives size at 435 members)
 August 24, 1912: Lloyd–La Follette Act, ch. 389, § 6, 
 February 13, 1913: Carlin Act
 March 1, 1913: Webb–Kenyon Act
 March 1, 1913: Railway Evaluation Act
 March 3, 1913: Publicity In Taking Evidence Act
 March 3, 1913: Virus-Serum-Toxin Act
 March 3, 1913: Gould Amendment
 March 4, 1913: Arlington Memorial Amphitheater Act
 March 4, 1913: Road and Trails Fund Act
 March 4, 1913: Burnett Act
 March 4, 1913: Weeks–McLean Act
 March 4, 1913: Federal Revenue Sharing Act
 March 4, 1913: Rivers and Harbors Act of 1913
 March 4, 1913: Burnt Timber Act
 March 4, 1913: Labor Department Act,

Constitutional amendments 
 May 13, 1912: Approved an amendment to the United States Constitution establishing the popular election of United States senators by the people of the states, and submitted it to the state legislatures for ratification
 Amendment was later ratified on April 8, 1913, becoming the seventeenth Amendment to the United States Constitution
 February 3, 1913: Sixteenth Amendment to the United States Constitution was ratified by the requisite number of states (then 36) to become part of the Constitution

States admitted and territories created 
 January 6, 1912: New Mexico admitted to the Union.
 February 14, 1912: Arizona admitted to the Union
 August 24, 1912: Alaska Territory created.

Party summary

Senate

House of Representatives

Leaders

Senate 

 President: James S. Sherman (R), until October 30, 1912; thereafter vacant
 Presidents pro tempore: William P. Frye (R), until April 27, 1911.
 For the remainder of this Congress, the office rotated among five senators. The Senate at that time was split between progressive Republicans, conservative Republicans, and Democrats. Each put forth a candidate, and the ballots were deadlocked until August 1911 when a compromise was reached. Democrat Augustus Bacon served for one day on August 14, 1911, and thereafter he and four Republicans rotated holding the seat for the remainder of the Congress.  These Republicans were: Charles Curtis, Jacob H. Gallinger, Frank B. Brandegee, and Henry Cabot Lodge.  
Republican Conference Chairman: Shelby Moore Cullom
 Democratic Caucus Chairman: Thomas S. Martin
 Republican Conference Secretary: Charles Curtis
 Democratic Caucus Secretary: William E. Chilton

House of Representatives 
 Speaker: Champ Clark (D)

Majority (Democratic) leadership 
Majority Leader: Oscar Underwood
Majority Whip: vacant
 Democratic Caucus Chairman: Albert S. Burleson
 Democratic Campaign Committee Chairman: James Tilghman Lloyd

Minority (Republican) leadership 
Minority Leader: James R. Mann
Minority Whip: John W. Dwight
 Republican Conference Chairman: Frank Dunklee Currier

Members 

Skip to House of Representatives, below

Senate 

At this time, most senators were elected by the state legislatures every two years, with one-third beginning new six-year terms with each Congress. A few senators were elected directly by the residents of the state. Preceding the names in the list below are Senate class numbers, which indicate the cycle of their election, In this Congress, Class 2 meant their term ended with this Congress, requiring reelection in 1912; Class 3 meant their term began in the last Congress, requiring reelection in 1914; and Class 1 meant their term began in this Congress, requiring reelection in 1916.

Alabama 
 2. John H. Bankhead (D)
 3. Joseph F. Johnston (D)

Arizona 
 1. Henry F. Ashurst (D), from April 2, 1912
 3. Marcus A. Smith (D), from April 2, 1912

Arkansas 
 2. Jeff Davis (D), until January 3, 1913
 John N. Heiskell (D), January 6, 1913 – January 29, 1913
 William M. Kavanaugh (D), from January 29, 1913
 3. James P. Clarke (D)

California 
 1. John D. Works (R)
 3. George C. Perkins (R)

Colorado 
 2. Simon Guggenheim (R)
 3. Charles S. Thomas (D), from January 15, 1913

Connecticut 
 1. George P. McLean (R)
 3. Frank B. Brandegee (R)

Delaware 
 1. Henry A. du Pont (R)
 2. Harry A. Richardson (R)

Florida 
 1. Nathan P. Bryan (D)
 3. Duncan U. Fletcher (D)

Georgia 
 2. Augustus O. Bacon (D)
 3. Joseph M. Terrell (D), until July 14, 1911
 Hoke Smith (D), from November 16, 1911

Idaho 
 2. William E. Borah (R)
 3. Weldon B. Heyburn (R), until October 17, 1912
 Kirtland I. Perky (D), November 18, 1912 – February 5, 1913
 James H. Brady (R), from February 6, 1913

Illinois 
 2. Shelby M. Cullom (R)
 3. William Lorimer (R), until July 13, 1912

Indiana 
 1. John W. Kern (D)
 3. Benjamin F. Shively (D)

Iowa 
 2. Lafayette Young (R), until April 11, 1911
 William S. Kenyon (R), from April 12, 1911
 3. Albert B. Cummins (R)

Kansas 
 2. Charles Curtis (R)
 3. Joseph L. Bristow (R)

Kentucky 
 2. Thomas H. Paynter (D)
 3. William O. Bradley (R)

Louisiana 
 2. Murphy J. Foster (D)
 3. John Thornton (D)

Maine 
 1. Charles F. Johnson (D)
 2. William P. Frye (R), until August 8, 1911
 Obadiah Gardner (D), from September 23, 1911

Maryland 
 1. Isidor Rayner (D), until November 25, 1912
 William P. Jackson (R), from November 29, 1912
 3. John W. Smith (D)

Massachusetts 
 1. Henry Cabot Lodge (R)
 2. Winthrop M. Crane (R)

Michigan 
 1. Charles E. Townsend (R)
 2. William Alden Smith (R)

Minnesota 
 1. Moses E. Clapp (R)
 2. Knute Nelson (R)

Mississippi 
 1. John S. Williams (D)
 2. LeRoy Percy (D)

Missouri 
 1. James A. Reed (D)
 3. William J. Stone (D)

Montana 
 1. Henry L. Myers (D)
 2. Joseph M. Dixon (R)

Nebraska 
 1. Gilbert M. Hitchcock (D)
 2. Norris Brown (R)

Nevada 
 1. George S. Nixon (R), until June 5, 1912
 William A. Massey (R), July 1, 1912 – January 29, 1913
 Key Pittman (D), from January 29, 1913
 3. Francis G. Newlands (D)

New Hampshire 
 2. Henry E. Burnham (R)
 3. Jacob H. Gallinger (R)

New Jersey 
 1. James E. Martine (D)
 2. Frank O. Briggs (R)

New Mexico 
 1. Thomas B. Catron (R), from April 2, 1912
 2. Albert B. Fall (R), from April 2, 1912

New York 
 1. James A. O'Gorman (D), from April 4, 1911
 3. Elihu A. Root (R)

North Carolina 
 2. Furnifold M. Simmons (D)
 3. Lee S. Overman (D)

North Dakota 
 1. Porter J. McCumber (R)
 3. Asle J. Gronna (R)

Ohio 
 1. Atlee Pomerene (D)
 3. Theodore E. Burton (R)

Oklahoma 
 2. Robert L. Owen (D)
 3. Thomas P. Gore (D)

Oregon 
 2. Jonathan Bourne Jr. (R)
 3. George E. Chamberlain (D)

Pennsylvania 
 1. George T. Oliver (R)
 3. Boies Penrose (R)

Rhode Island 
 1. Henry F. Lippitt (R)
 2. George P. Wetmore (R)

South Carolina 
 2. Benjamin Tillman (D)
 3. Ellison D. Smith (D)

South Dakota 
 2. Robert J. Gamble (R)
 3. Coe I. Crawford (R)

Tennessee 
 1. Luke Lea (D)
 2. Robert L. Taylor (D), until March 31, 1912
 Newell Sanders (R), April 11, 1912 – January 24, 1913
 William R. Webb (D), from January 24, 1913

Texas 
 1. Charles A. Culberson (D)
 2. Joseph W. Bailey (D), until January 3, 1913
 Rienzi M. Johnston (D), January 4, 1913 – January 29, 1913
 Morris Sheppard (D), from February 3, 1913

Utah 
 1. George Sutherland (R)
 3. Reed Smoot (R)

Vermont 
 1. Carroll S. Page (R)
 3. William P. Dillingham (R)

Virginia 
 1. Claude A. Swanson (D)
 2. Thomas S. Martin (D)

Washington 
 1. Miles Poindexter (R)
 3. Wesley L. Jones (R)

West Virginia 
 1. William E. Chilton (D)
 2. Clarence W. Watson (D)

Wisconsin 
 1. Robert M. La Follette Sr. (R)
 3. Isaac Stephenson (R)

Wyoming 
 1. Clarence D. Clark (R)
 2. Francis E. Warren (R)

House of Representatives 

The names of members of the House of Representatives are preceded by their district numbers.

Alabama 
 . George W. Taylor (D)
 . S. Hubert Dent Jr. (D)
 . Henry D. Clayton (D)
 . Fred L. Blackmon (D)
 . J. Thomas Heflin (D)
 . Richmond P. Hobson (D)
 . John L. Burnett (D)
 . William N. Richardson (D)
 . Oscar W. Underwood (D)

Arizona 
 . Carl Hayden (D), from February 19, 1912

Arkansas 
 . Robert B. Macon (D)
 . William A. Oldfield (D)
 . John C. Floyd (D)
 . William B. Cravens (D)
 . Henderson M. Jacoway (D)
 . Joseph Taylor Robinson (D), until January 14, 1913
 Samuel M. Taylor (D), from January 15, 1913
 . William S. Goodwin (D)

California 
 . John E. Raker (D)
 . William Kent (R)
 . Joseph R. Knowland (R)
 . Julius Kahn (R)
 . Everis A. Hayes (R)
 . James C. Needham (R)
 . William D. Stephens (R)
 . Sylvester C. Smith (R), until January 26, 1913

Colorado 
 . Edward T. Taylor (D)
 . Atterson Walden Rucker (D)
 . John A. Martin (D)

Connecticut 
 . John Q. Tilson (R)
 . E. Stevens Henry (R)
 . Thomas L. Reilly (D)
 . Edwin W. Higgins (R)
 . Ebenezer J. Hill (R)

Delaware 
 . William H. Heald (R)

Florida 
 . Stephen M. Sparkman (D)
 . Frank Clark (D)
 . Dannite H. Mays (D)

Georgia 
 . Charles G. Edwards (D)
 . Seaborn Roddenbery (D)
 . Dudley M. Hughes (D)
 . William C. Adamson (D)
 . William S. Howard (D)
 . Charles L. Bartlett (D)
 . Gordon Lee (D)
 . Samuel J. Tribble (D)
 . Thomas Montgomery Bell (D)
 . Thomas W. Hardwick (D)
 . William G. Brantley (D)

Idaho 
 . Burton L. French (R)

Illinois 
 . Martin B. Madden (R)
 . James R. Mann (R)
 . William W. Wilson (R)
 . James T. McDermott (D)
 . Adolph J. Sabath (D)
 . Edmund J. Stack (D)
 . Frank Buchanan (D)
 . Thomas Gallagher (D)
 . Lynden Evans (D)
 . George E. Foss (R)
 . Ira C. Copley (R)
 . Charles Eugene Fuller (R)
 . John C. McKenzie (R)
 . James McKinney (R)
 . George W. Prince (R)
 . Claude U. Stone (D)
 . John A. Sterling (R)
 . Joseph G. Cannon (R)
 . William B. McKinley (R)
 . Henry T. Rainey (D)
 . James M. Graham (D)
 . William A. Rodenberg (R)
 . Martin D. Foster (D)
 . H. Robert Fowler (D)
 . Napoleon B. Thistlewood (R)

Indiana 
 . John W. Boehne (D)
 . William A. Cullop (D)
 . William E. Cox (D)
 . Lincoln Dixon (D)
 . Ralph Wilbur Moss (D)
 . Finly H. Gray (D)
 . Charles A. Korbly (D)
 . John A.M. Adair (D)
 . Martin A. Morrison (D)
 . Edgar D. Crumpacker (R)
 . George W. Rauch (D)
 . Cyrus Cline (D)
 . Henry A. Barnhart (D)

Iowa 
 . Charles A. Kennedy (R)
 . Irvin S. Pepper (D)
 . Charles E. Pickett (R)
 . Gilbert N. Haugen (R)
 . James W. Good (R)
 . Nathan E. Kendall (R)
 . Solomon F. Prouty (R)
 . Horace M. Towner (R)
 . Walter I. Smith (R), until March 15, 1911
 William R. Green (R), from June 5, 1911
 . Frank P. Woods (R)
 . Elbert H. Hubbard (R), until June 4, 1912
 George Cromwell Scott (R), from November 5, 1912

Kansas 
 . Daniel R. Anthony Jr. (R)
 . Alexander C. Mitchell (R), until July 7, 1911
 Joseph Taggart (D), from November 7, 1911
 . Philip P. Campbell (R)
 . Fred S. Jackson (R)
 . Rollin R. Rees (R)
 . Isaac D. Young (R)
 . Edmond H. Madison (R), until September 18, 1911
 George A. Neeley (D), from January 9, 1912
 . Victor Murdock (R)

Kentucky 
 . Ollie M. James (D)
 . Augustus Stanley (D)
 . Robert Y. Thomas Jr. (D)
 . Ben Johnson (D)
 . J. Swagar Sherley (D)
 . Arthur B. Rouse (D)
 . J. Campbell Cantrill (D)
 . Harvey Helm (D)
 . William Jason Fields (D)
 . John W. Langley (R)
 . Caleb Powers (R)

Louisiana 
 . Albert Estopinal (D)
 . Henry Garland Dupré (D)
 . Robert Foligny Broussard (D)
 . John Thomas Watkins (D)
 . Joseph Eugene Ransdell (D)
 . Robert Charles Wickliffe (D), until June 11, 1912
 Lewis Lovering Morgan (D), from November 5, 1912
 . Arsène Paulin Pujó (D)

Maine 
 . Asher C. Hinds (R)
 . Daniel J. McGillicuddy (D)
 . Samuel W. Gould (D)
 . Frank E. Guernsey (R)

Maryland 
 . J. Harry Covington (D)
 . J. Frederick C. Talbott (D)
 . George Konig (D)
 . J. Charles Linthicum (D)
 . Thomas Parran Sr. (R)
 . David J. Lewis (D)

Massachusetts 
 . George P. Lawrence (R)
 . Frederick H. Gillett (R)
 . John A. Thayer (D)
 . William H. Wilder (R)
 . Butler Ames (R)
 . Augustus P. Gardner (R)
 . Ernest W. Roberts (R)
 . Samuel W. McCall (R)
 . William F. Murray (D)
 . James Michael Curley (D)
 . Andrew J. Peters (D)
 . John W. Weeks (R)
 . William S. Greene (R)
 . Robert O. Harris (R)

Michigan 
 . Frank E. Doremus (D)
 . William Wedemeyer (R), until January 2, 1913
 . John M. C. Smith (R)
 . Edward L. Hamilton (R)
 . Edwin F. Sweet (D)
 . Samuel W. Smith (R)
 . Henry McMorran (R)
 . Joseph W. Fordney (R)
 . James C. McLaughlin (R)
 . George A. Loud (R)
 . Francis H. Dodds (R)
 . H. Olin Young (R)

Minnesota 
 . Sydney Anderson (R)
 . Winfield Scott Hammond (D)
 . Charles Russell Davis (R)
 . Frederick Stevens (R)
 . Frank Nye (R)
 . Charles August Lindbergh (R)
 . Andrew Volstead (R)
 . Clarence B. Miller (R)
 . Halvor Steenerson (R)

Mississippi 
 . Ezekiel S. Candler Jr. (D)
 . Hubert D. Stephens (D)
 . Benjamin G. Humphreys II (D)
 . Thomas U. Sisson (D)
 . Samuel Andrew Witherspoon (D)
 . Pat Harrison (D)
 . William A. Dickson (D)
 . James W. Collier (D)

Missouri 
 . James Tilghman Lloyd (D)
 . William W. Rucker (D)
 . Joshua Willis Alexander (D)
 . Charles F. Booher (D)
 . William Patterson Borland (D)
 . Clement C. Dickinson (D)
 . Courtney W. Hamlin (D)
 . Dorsey W. Shackleford (D)
 . James Beauchamp Clark (D)
 . Richard Bartholdt (R)
 . Theron Ephron Catlin (R), until August 12, 1912
 Patrick F. Gill (D), from August 12, 1912
 . Leonidas C. Dyer (R)
 . Walter Lewis Hensley (D)
 . Joseph J. Russell (D)
 . James Alexander Daugherty (D)
 . Thomas L. Rubey (D)

Montana 
 . Charles N. Pray (R)

Nebraska 
 . John A. Maguire (D)
 . Charles O. Lobeck (D)
 . James P. Latta (D), until September 11, 1911
 Dan V. Stephens (D), from November 7, 1911
 . Charles Henry Sloan (R)
 . George W. Norris (R)
 . Moses P. Kinkaid (R)

Nevada 
 . Edwin E. Roberts (R)

New Hampshire 
 . Cyrus Adams Sulloway (R)
 . Frank Dunklee Currier (R)

New Jersey 
 . Henry C. Loudenslager (R), until August 12, 1911
 William J. Browning (R), from November 7, 1911
 . John James Gardner (R)
 . Thomas J. Scully (D)
 . Ira W. Wood (R)
 . William E. Tuttle Jr. (D)
 . William Hughes (D), until September 27, 1912
 Archibald C. Hart (D), from November 5, 1912
 . Edward W. Townsend (D)
 . Walter I. McCoy (D)
 . Eugene F. Kinkead (D)
 . James A. Hamill (D)

New Mexico 
 . Harvey B. Fergusson (D), from January 8, 1912
 . George Curry (R), from January 8, 1912

New York 
 . Martin W. Littleton (D)
 . George H. Lindsay (D)
 . James P. Maher (D)
 . Frank E. Wilson (D)
 . William C. Redfield (D)
 . William M. Calder (R)
 . John J. Fitzgerald (D)
 . Daniel J. Riordan (D)
 . Henry M. Goldfogle (D)
 . William Sulzer (D), until December 31, 1912
 . Charles V. Fornes (D)
 . Michael F. Conry (D)
 . Jefferson M. Levy (D)
 . John J. Kindred (D)
 . Thomas G. Patten (D)
 . Francis B. Harrison (D)
 . Henry George Jr. (D)
 . Stephen B. Ayres (D)
 . John E. Andrus (R)
 . Thomas W. Bradley (R)
 . Richard E. Connell (D), until October 30, 1912
 . William H. Draper (R)
 . Henry S. De Forest (R)
 . George W. Fairchild (R)
 . Theron Akin (R)
 . George R. Malby (R), until July 5, 1912
 Edwin A. Merritt (R), from November 5, 1912
 . Charles A. Talcott (D)
 . Luther W. Mott (R)
 . Michael E. Driscoll (R)
 . John W. Dwight (R)
 . Sereno E. Payne (R)
 . Henry G. Danforth (R)
 . Edwin S. Underhill (D)
 . James S. Simmons (R)
 . Daniel A. Driscoll (D)
 . Charles B. Smith (D)
 . Edward B. Vreeland (R)

North Carolina 
 . John Humphrey Small (D)
 . Claude Kitchin (D)
 . John M. Faison (D)
 . Edward W. Pou (D)
 . Charles M. Stedman (D)
 . Hannibal L. Godwin (D)
 . Robert N. Page (D)
 . Robert L. Doughton (D)
 . Edwin Y. Webb (D)
 . James M. Gudger Jr. (D)

North Dakota 
 . Louis B. Hanna (R), until January 7, 1913
 . Henry Thomas Helgesen (R)

Ohio 
 . Nicholas Longworth (R)
 . Alfred G. Allen (D)
 . James M. Cox (D), until January 12, 1913
 . J. Henry Goeke (D)
 . Timothy T. Ansberry (D)
 . Matthew R. Denver (D)
 . James D. Post (D)
 . Frank B. Willis (R)
 . Isaac R. Sherwood (D)
 . Robert M. Switzer (R)
 . Horatio C. Claypool (D)
 . Edward L. Taylor Jr. (R)
 . Carl C. Anderson (D), until October 1, 1912
 . William G. Sharp (D)
 . George White (D)
 . William B. Francis (D)
 . William A. Ashbrook (D)
 . John J. Whitacre (D)
 . Elsworth R. Bathrick (D)
 . L. Paul Howland (R)
 . Robert J. Bulkley (D)

Oklahoma 
 . Bird Segle McGuire (R)
 . Dick Thompson Morgan (R)
 . James S. Davenport (D)
 . Charles D. Carter (D)
 . Scott Ferris (D)

Oregon 
 . Willis C. Hawley (R)
 . Walter Lafferty (R)

Pennsylvania 
 . Henry H. Bingham (R), until March 22, 1912
 William S. Vare (R), from May 24, 1912
 . William S. Reyburn (R), from May 23, 1911
 . J. Hampton Moore (R)
 . Reuben O. Moon (R)
 . Michael Donohoe (D)
 . George D. McCreary (R)
 . Thomas S. Butler (R)
 . Robert E. Difenderfer (D)
 . William W. Griest (R)
 . John R. Farr (R)
 . Charles C. Bowman (R), until December 12, 1912
 . Robert Emmett Lee (D)
 . John H. Rothermel (D)
 . George W. Kipp (D), until July 24, 1911
 William D.B. Ainey (R), from November 7, 1911
 . William B. Wilson (D)
 . John G. McHenry (D), until December 27, 1912
 . Benjamin K. Focht (R)
 . Marlin E. Olmsted (R)
 . Jesse L. Hartman (R)
 . Daniel F. Lafean (R)
 . Charles E. Patton (R)
 . Curtis H. Gregg (D)
 . Thomas S. Crago (R)
 . Charles Matthews (R)
 . Arthur L. Bates (R)
 . A. Mitchell Palmer (D)
 . J. N. Langham (R)
 . Peter M. Speer (R)
 . Stephen G. Porter (R)
 . John Dalzell (R)
 . James F. Burke (R)
 . Andrew J. Barchfeld (R)

Rhode Island 
 . George Francis O'Shaunessy (D)
 . George H. Utter (R), until November 3, 1912

South Carolina 
 . George S. Legare (D), until January 31, 1913
 . James F. Byrnes (D)
 . Wyatt Aiken (D)
 . Joseph T. Johnson (D)
 . David E. Finley (D)
 . J. Edwin Ellerbe (D)
 . Asbury F. Lever (D)

South Dakota 
 . Charles H. Burke (R)
 . Eben Martin (R)

Tennessee 
 . Sam R. Sells (R)
 . Richard W. Austin (R)
 . John Austin Moon (D)
 . Cordell Hull (D)
 . William C. Houston (D)
 . Joseph W. Byrns (D)
 . Lemuel Phillips Padgett (D)
 . Thetus Willrette Sims (D)
 . Finis J. Garrett (D)
 . George W. Gordon (D), until August 9, 1911
 Kenneth McKellar (D), from December 4, 1911

Texas 
 . John Morris Sheppard (D), until February 3, 1913
 . Martin Dies (D)
 . James Young (D)
 . Choice Boswell Randell (D)
 . James Andrew Beall (D)
 . Rufus Hardy (D)
 . Alexander W. Gregg (D)
 . John M. Moore (D)
 . George Farmer Burgess (D)
 . Albert Sidney Burleson (D)
 . Robert L. Henry (D)
 . Oscar Callaway (D)
 . John Hall Stephens (D)
 . James L. Slayden (D)
 . John Nance Garner (D)
 . William R. Smith (D)

Utah 
 . Joseph Howell (R)

Vermont 
 . David J. Foster (R), until March 21, 1912
 Frank L. Greene (R), from July 30, 1912
 . Frank Plumley (R)

Virginia 
 . William Atkinson Jones (D)
 . Edward Everett Holland (D)
 . John Lamb (D)
 . Robert Turnbull (D)
 . Edward W. Saunders (D)
 . Carter Glass (D)
 . James Hay (D)
 . Charles Creighton Carlin (D)
 . C. Bascom Slemp (R)
 . Henry De Flood (D)

Washington 
 . William E. Humphrey (R)
 . Stanton Warburton (R)
 . William Leroy La Follette (R)

West Virginia 
 . John W. Davis (D)
 . William Gay Brown Jr. (D)
 . Adam B. Littlepage (D)
 . John M. Hamilton (D)
 . James Anthony Hughes (R)

Wisconsin 
 . Henry Allen Cooper (R)
 . John M. Nelson (R)
 . Arthur W. Kopp (R)
 . William J. Cary (R)
 . Victor L. Berger (S)
 . Michael Edmund Burke (D)
 . John Jacob Esch (R)
 . James Henry Davidson (R)
 . Thomas Frank Konop (D)
 . Elmer A. Morse (R)
 . Irvine L. Lenroot (R)

Wyoming 
 . Franklin Wheeler Mondell (R)

Non-voting members 
 . James Wickersham (R)
 . Ralph H. Cameron (R), until February 14, 1912
 . Jonah Kuhio Kalanianaole (R)
 . William Henry Andrews (R), until January 6, 1912
 . Benito Legarda y Tuason (Resident Commissioner), (Fed., R)
 . Manuel L. Quezon (Resident Commissioner), (Nac.)
 . Luis Muñoz Rivera (Resident Commissioner), (Unionist)

Changes in membership

Senate 

There were 20 changes: 6 deaths, 2 resignations, 1 invalidated election, 6 appointees replaced by electees, 4 seats added from new states, and 1 seat vacant from the previous Congress. Democrats had a 4-seat net gain, and no other parties had a net change.

House of Representatives 

House vacancies are only filled by elections. State laws regulate when (and if) there will be special elections.

Committees

Senate 

 Additional Accommodations for the Library of Congress (Select) (Chairman: Josiah W. Bailey; Ranking Member: Shelby M. Cullom)
 Agriculture and Forestry (Chairman: Henry E. Burnham; Ranking Member: John H. Bankhead)
 Appropriations (Chairman: Francis E. Warren; Ranking Member: Benjamin R. Tillman)
 Audit and Control the Contingent Expenses of the Senate (Chairman: Frank O. Briggs; Ranking Member: James P. Clarke)
 Canadian Relations (Chairman: George T. Oliver; Ranking Member: Benjamin R. Tillman)
 Census (Chairman: Robert M. La Follette; Ranking Member: Joseph W. Bailey)
 Civil Service and Retrenchment (Chairman: Albert B. Cummins; Ranking Member: James P. Clarke)
 Claims (Chairman: Coe I. Crawford; Ranking Member: Thomas S. Martin)
 Coast and Insular Survey (Chairman: Charles E. Townsend; Ranking Member: Charles A. Culberson)
 Coast Defenses (Chairman: Charles Curtis; Ranking Member: Furnifold M. Simmons)
 Commerce (Chairman: William P. Frye; Ranking Member: Thomas S. Martin)
 Conservation of National Resources (Chairman: Joseph M. Dixon; Ranking Member: Francis G. Newlands)
 Corporations Organized in the District of Columbia (Chairman: Francis G. Newlands; Ranking Member: Norris Brown)
 Cuban Relations (Chairman: Carroll S. Page; Ranking Member: Furnifold M. Simmons)
 Disposition of Useless Papers in the Executive Departments (Chairman: James P. Clarke; Ranking Member: Henry E. Burnham)
 Distributing Public Revenue Among the States (Select)
 District of Columbia (Chairman: Jacob H. Gallinger; Ranking Member: Thomas S. Martin)
 Education and Labor (Chairman: William E. Borah; Ranking Member: Isidor Rayner then John H. Bankhead)
 Election of William Lorimer (Select)
 Engrossed Bills (Chairman: Furnifold M. Simmons; Ranking Member: Henry Cabot Lodge)
 Enrolled Bills (Chairman: Isaac Stephenson; Ranking Member: Murphy J. Foster)
 Establish a University in the United States (Select)
 Examine the Several Branches in the Civil Service (Chairman: Thomas H. Paynter; Ranking Member: Harry A. Richardson)
 Expenditures in the Department of Agriculture (Chairman: Henry F. Lippitt; Ranking Member: Furnifold M. Simmons)
 Expenditures in the Department of Commerce and Labor (Chairman: Miles Poindexter; Ranking Member: N/A)
 Expenditures in the Interior Department (Chairman: James M. Graham; Ranking Member: Jeff Davis)
 Expenditures in the Department of Justice (Chairman: William O. Bradley; Ranking Member: Joseph W. Bailey)
 Expenditures in the Navy Department (Chairman: Asle J. Gronna; Ranking Member: Thomas S. Martin)
 Expenditures in the Post Office Department (Chairman: Joseph L. Bristow; Ranking Member: Augustus O. Bacon)
 Expenditures in the Department of State (Chairman: William S. Kenyon; Ranking Member: William J. Stone)
 Expenditures in the Treasury Department (Chairman: Theodore E. Burton; Ranking Member: John W. Smith)
 Expenditures in the War Department (Chairman: John D. Works; Ranking Member: Murphy J. Foster Jr.)
 Finance (Chairman: Boies Penrose; Ranking Member: Joseph W. Bailey)
 Fisheries (Chairman: Wesley L. Jones; Ranking Member: Joseph W. Bailey)
 Five Civilized Tribes of Indians (Chairman: Benjamin R. Tillman; Ranking Member: Moses E. Clapp)
 Foreign Relations (Chairman: Shelby M. Cullom; Ranking Member: Augustus O. Bacon)
 Forest Reservations and the Protection of Game (Chairman: George P. McLean; Ranking Member: Benjamin R. Tillman)
 Geological Survey (Chairman: Robert L. Taylor; Ranking Member: Frank O. Briggs)
 Immigration (Chairman: Henry Cabot Lodge; Ranking Member: Jeff Davis)
 Impeachment of Robert H. Archibald (Select)
 Indian Affairs (Chairman: Robert J. Gamble; Ranking Member: William J. Stone)
 Indian Depredations (Chairman: Isidor Rayner then Jeff Davis; Ranking Member: Charles Curtis)
 Industrial Expositions (Chairman: Elihu Root; Ranking Member: Isidor Rayner then Lee S. Overman)
 Interoceanic Canals (Chairman: Frank B. Brandegee; Ranking Member: Furnifold M. Simmons)
 Interstate Commerce (Chairman: Moses E. Clapp; Ranking Member: Benjamin R. Tillman)
 Irrigation and Reclamation (Chairman: George S. Nixon; Ranking Member: Joseph W. Bailey)
 Judiciary (Chairman: Clarence D. Clark; Ranking Member: Augustus O. Bacon)
 Library (Chairman: George P. Wetmore; Ranking Member: Francis G. Newlands)
 Manufactures (Chairman: Weldon B. Heyburn; Ranking Member: Ellison D. Smith)
 Military Affairs (Chairman: Henry A. du Pont; Ranking Member: Murphy J. Foster)
 Mines and Mining (Chairman: William Lorimer; Ranking Member: Benjamin R. Tillman)
 Mississippi River and its Tributaries (Select) (Chairman: Jeff Davis; Ranking Member: Norris Brown)
 National Banks (Chairman: George C. Perkins)
 Naval Affairs (Chairman: George C. Perkins; Ranking Member: Benjamin R. Tillman)
 Pacific Islands and Puerto Rico (Chairman: Harry A. Richardson; Ranking Member: James P. Clarke)
 Pacific Railroads (Chairman: Robert L. Owen; Ranking Member: William A. Smith)
 Patents (Chairman: Norris Brown; Ranking Member: Benjamin F. Shively)
 Pensions (Chairman: Porter J. McCumber; Ranking Member: Robert L. Taylor)
 Philippines (Chairman: Simon Guggenheim; Ranking Member: Joseph F. Johnston)
 Post Office and Post Roads (Chairman: Jonathan Bourne Jr.; Ranking Member: John H. Bankhead)
 Printing (Chairman: Reed Smoot; Ranking Member: John W. Smith)
 Private Land Claims (Chairman: Augustus O. Bacon; Ranking Member: William A. Smith)
 Privileges and Elections (Chairman: William P. Dillingham; Ranking Member: Thomas H. Paynter)
 Public Buildings and Grounds (Chairman: George Sutherland; Ranking Member: Charles A. Culberson)
 Public Health and National Quarantine (Chairman: Charles A. Culberson; Ranking Member: Reed Smoot)
 Public Lands (Chairman: Knute Nelson; Ranking Member: Francis G. Newlands)
 Railroads (Chairman: Thomas P. Gore; Ranking Member: Clarence D. Clark)
 Revision of the Laws (Chairman: Weldon B. Heyburn)
 Revolutionary Claims (Chairman: William J. Stone; Ranking Member: William O. Bradley)
 Rules (Chairman: Winthrop Murray Crane; Ranking Member: Augustus O. Bacon)
 Standards, Weights and Measures (Chairman: John H. Bankhead; Ranking Member: William E. Borah)
 Tariff Regulation (Select)
 Territories (Chairman: William A. Smith; Ranking Member: Robert L. Owen)
 Third Degree Ordeal
 Transportation and Sale of Meat Products (Select) (Chairman: Murphy J. Foster; Ranking Member: Clarence D. Clark)
 Transportation Routes to the Seaboard (Chairman: Ellison D. Smith; Ranking Member: Clarence D. Clark)
 Trespassers upon Indian Lands (Select) (Chairman: John W. Smith; Ranking Member: William O. Bradley)
 Whole
 Woman Suffrage (Chairman: Lee S. Overman; Ranking Member: George P. Wetmore)

House of Representatives 

 Accounts (Chairman: James T. Lloyd; Ranking Member: James A. Hughes)
 Agriculture (Chairman: John Lamb; Ranking Member: Gilbert N. Haugen)
 Alcoholic Liquor Traffic (Chairman: Ezekiel S. Candler Jr.; Ranking Member: Andrew J. Barchfeld)
 Appropriations (Chairman: John J. Fitzgerald; Ranking Member: Joseph G. Cannon)
 American Sugar Refining Company (Special)
 Banking and Currency (Chairman: Arsene P. Pujo; Ranking Member: Edward B. Vreeland)
 Census (Chairman: William C. Houston; Ranking Member: Edgar D. Crumpacker)
 Claims (Chairman: Edward W. Pou; Ranking Member: William H. Heald)
 Coinage, Weights and Measures (Chairman: Thomas W. Hardwick; Ranking Member: William W. Griest)
 Disposition of Executive Papers (Chairman: J. Frederick Cockey Talbott; Ranking Member: George D. McCreary)
 District of Columbia (Chairman: Ben Johnson; Ranking Member: Julius Kahn)
 Education (Chairman: Asbury F. Lever; Ranking Member: James F. Burke)
 Election of the President, Vice President and Representatives in Congress (Chairman: William W. Rucker; Ranking Member: Marlin E. Olmsted)
 Elections No.#1 (Chairman: Timothy T. Ansberry; Ranking Member: Solomon F. Prouty)
 Elections No.#2 (Chairman: James A. Hamill; Ranking Member: John M. Nelson)
 Elections No.#3 (Chairman: Henry M. Goldfogle; Ranking Member: Henry A. Cooper)
 Enrolled Bills (Chairman: Ben Cravens; Ranking Member: Daniel Read Anthony)
 Expenditures in the Agriculture Department (Chairman: Ralph W. Moss; Ranking Member: Edwin W. Higgins)
 Expenditures in the Commerce and Labor Departments (Chairman: John H. Rothermel; Ranking Member: Bird S. McGuire)
 Expenditures in the Interior Department (Chairman: James M. Graham; Ranking Member: Franklin W. Mondell)
 Expenditures in the Justice Department (Chairman: Jack Beall; Ranking Member: Elbert H. Hubbard)
 Expenditures in the Navy Department (Chairman: Rufus Hardy; Ranking Member: William B. McKinley)
 Expenditures in the Post Office Department (Chairman: William A. Ashbrook; Ranking Member: Richard W. Austin)
 Expenditures in the State Department (Chairman: Courtney W. Hamlin; Ranking Member: Charles R. Davis)
 Expenditures in the Treasury Department (Chairman: William E. Cox; Ranking Member: Ebenezer J. Hill)
 Expenditures in the War Department (Chairman: Harvey Helm; Ranking Member: Asher C. Hinds)
 Expenditures on Public Buildings (Chairman: Cyrus Cline; Ranking Member: E. Stevens Henry)
 Foreign Affairs (Chairman: William Sulzer; Ranking Member: William B. McKinley)
 Immigration and Naturalization (Chairman: John L. Burnett; Ranking Member: Augustus P. Gardner)
 Indian Affairs (Chairman: John H. Stephens; Ranking Member: Charles H. Burke)
 Industrial Arts and Expositions (Chairman: J. Thomas Heflin; Ranking Member: William A. Rodenberg)
 Insular Affairs (Chairman: William A. Jones; Ranking Member: Marlin E. Olmsted)
 Interstate and Foreign Commerce (Chairman: William C. Adamson; Ranking Member: Frederick C. Stevens)
 Invalid Pensions (Chairman: Isaac R. Sherwood; Ranking Member: Charles H. Burke)
 Irrigation of Arid Lands (Chairman: William R. Smith; Ranking Member: Moses P. Kinkaid)
 Judiciary (Chairman: Henry De Lamar Clayton; Ranking Member: John A. Sterling)
 Labor (Chairman: William B. Wilson; Ranking Member: John J. Gardner)
 Levees and Improvements of the Mississippi River (Chairman: James L. Slayden; Ranking Member: N/A)
 Merchant Marine and Fisheries (Chairman: Joshua W. Alexander; Ranking Member: William S. Greene)
 Mileage (Chairman: Robert E. Lee; Ranking Member: Charles A. Kennedy)
 Military Affairs (Chairman: James Hay; Ranking Member: George W. Prince)
 Mines and Mining (Chairman: Martin D. Foster; Ranking Member: Joseph Howell)
 Naval Affairs (Chairman: Lemuel P. Padgett; Ranking Member: George Edmund Foss)
 Patents (Chairman: William A. Oldfield; Ranking Member: Frank D. Currier)
 Pensions (Chairman: William Richardson; Ranking Member: Ira W. Wood)
 Post Office and Post Roads (Chairman: John A. Moon; Ranking Member: John W. Weeks)
 Public Buildings and Grounds (Chairman: David E. Finley; Ranking Member: Benjamin K. Focht)
 Public Lands (Chairman: Morris Sheppard; Ranking Member: Franklin W. Mondell)
 Railways and Canals (Chairman: Charles A. Korbly; Ranking Member: Frederick H. Gillett)
 Reform in the Civil Service (Chairman: Charles A. Korbly; Ranking Member: George P. Lawrence)
 Revision of Laws (Chairman: John T. Watkins; Ranking Member: Reuben O. Moon)
 Rivers and Harbors (Chairman: Stephen M. Sparkman; Ranking Member: George P. Lawrence)
 Rules (Chairman: Robert L. Henry; Ranking Member: John Dalzell)
 Standards of Official Conduct
 Territories (Chairman: Henry D. Flood; Ranking Member: Richard E. Connell then William H. Draper)
 War Claims (Chairman: Thetus W. Sims; Ranking Member: Elmer A. Morse)
 Ways and Means (Chairman: Oscar Underwood; Ranking Member: Sereno E. Payne)
 Whole

Joint committees 

 Conditions of Indian Tribes (Special)
 Disposition of (Useless) Executive Papers
 Federal Aid in Construction of Post Roads
 Investigations of Conditions in Alaska (Chairman: Sen. Knute Nelson)
 Investigate the General Parcel Post
 The Library
 Printing (Chairman: Sen. Reed Smoot)
 Postage on 2nd Class Mail Matter and Compensation for Transportation of Mail (Chairman: Sen. Jonathan Bourne Jr.)
 Second Class Mail Matter and Compensation for Rail Mail Service

Caucuses 
 Democratic (House)
 Democratic (Senate)

Employees

Legislative branch agency directors 
 Architect of the Capitol: Elliott Woods
 Librarian of Congress: Herbert Putnam
 Public Printer of the United States: Samuel B. Donnelly

Senate 
 Chaplain: Ulysses G.B. Pierce, Unitarian
 Secretary: Charles G. Bennett
 Librarian: Edward C. Goodwin
 Sergeant at Arms: Daniel M. Ransdell, until December 10, 1912
 E. Livingston Cornelius, elected December 10, 1912

House of Representatives 
 Clerk: Alexander McDowell, until March 3, 1911.
 South Trimble, from April 4, 1911.
 Chaplain: Henry N. Couden, Universalist
 Clerk at the Speaker's Table: Charles R. Crisp
 Doorkeeper: Joseph J. Sinnott
 Reading Clerks: Patrick Joseph Haltigan (D) and H. Martin Williams (R)
 Postmaster: William M. Dunbar
 Sergeant at Arms: Henry Casson, until April 4, 1911.
 W. Stokes Jackson, died June 1912.
 Charles F. Riddell, elected July 18, 1912.

See also 
 1910 United States elections (elections leading to this Congress)
 1910–11 United States Senate elections
 1910 United States House of Representatives elections
 1912 United States elections (elections during this Congress, leading to the next Congress)
 1912 United States presidential election
 1912–13 United States Senate elections
 1912 United States House of Representatives elections

Notes

References